Richard Michael Fox (1891–December 1969), better known as R. M. Fox, was a journalist and historian of the Irish left.

Fox was born in Leeds in 1891, the second of four sons to a schoolteacher mother and engineering workman father. His parents were active in the Co-operative Movement, and as a young man Fox joined the Socialist Party of Great Britain and the Industrial Workers of the World.

On the outbreak of World War I, Fox denounced it as an imperialist war in which workers had no interest. His refusal to be conscripted led to his being tried and imprisoned several times throughout the war. He was abruptly released in April 1919; later that year he authored his first book, Factory Echoes, and enrolled at Ruskin College in Oxford.

While at Ruskin, Fox became the editor of New Oxford and gained a reputation as a labour journalist. He was invited to Soviet Russia in 1921 to observe the results of the recent Russian Revolution, and in 1922 he visited Dublin and established contacts with leading leftist figures there.

Following his graduation from Ruskin, Fox married children's author Patricia Lynch and they spent time in London, Paris, Brussels, and Germany before eventually settling in Dublin. Fox's articles appeared in the Irish Statesman and in the late 1920s he began publishing his books through Virginia Woolf's Hogarth Press. His autobiography, Smoky Crusade, was published in 1937.

During "The Emergency", the Irish Directorate of Military Intelligence was concerned about The Irish Press having Fox, Maire Comerford, Brian O'Neill, Geoffrey Coulter, and Tom Mullins on its staff.

Fox also commented and published on the state of Irish literature and theatre. Reviewing Teresa Deevy in 1948 he comments that while her plays were remarkable they were not frequently staged. "I ask myself why the work of a modern Irish dramatist of such creative power is not seen more often on the Irish stage."

An account of Fox’s trip to Maoist China was published as China Diary in 1959.

Fox died in December 1969, three years before his wife. They are both buried in Glasnevin Cemetery.

Selected bibliography
Factory Echoes, 1919.
Rebel Irishwomen, 1935.
Smoky Crusade, 1937.
Green Banners: The story of the Irish struggle, 1938.
The History of the Irish Citizen Army, 1943.
James Connolly: The Forerunner, 1943
Years of Freedom: the story of Ireland 1921–48, 1948.
Jim Larkin: The Rise of the Underman, 1957.
Louie Bennett: Her Life and Times, 1958.
China Diary, 1959.

References

Anne Brady, Brian Cleeve. Biographical Dictionary of Irish Writers. Lilliput (1985). 
Princess Grace Irish Library
Patricia Lynch. A Story-Teller's Childhood, 1947.
Review in The Irish Times, 1948

External links 
 R.M.Fox at The Teresa Deevy Archive
Historyeye | Patricia Lynch: a storyteller's childhood revisited 

1891 births
1969 deaths
Socialist Party of Great Britain members
English expatriates in Ireland
British male journalists
Alumni of Ruskin College
Industrial Workers of the World members
Burials at Glasnevin Cemetery
Writers from Leeds
20th-century British historians
World War I